Salgaocar Football Club is an Indian professional football club based in Vasco, Goa, that competes in the Goa Professional League. They have also played in the I-League, then top flight of Indian football league system. Founded in 1956, the club is owned by the V. M. Salgaocar Group of Companies.

Salgaocar has won 21 Goa League Championships, 4 Federation Cups, 3 Durand Cups, 3 Rovers Cups, 2 Indian Super Cups and the National Football League in 1998–99 and I-League in 2010–11. They became the first Goan side to win the NFL in 1998–99 under the guidance of coach Shabbir Ali. It is also the first Goan club to win the following: 
Goa Super Division, Federation Cup, Goa Professional League, Durand Cup and the former Indian Super Cup.

Salgaocar pulled out of I-League 2016–17 citing All India Football Federation (AIFF) bias against I-League.

History

1956–2009
Salgaocar Sports Club was established in 1956. It was founded by VM Salgaocar, founder President of the VM Salgaocar Group of Companies, to give a platform to the Goan youth to showcase their talent to the country, and to the world.

In 1962, Salgaocar Sports Club became the first Goan team to be extended an invitation to play in the prestigious Durand Cup in New Delhi, and such was the joy of a Goan team's participation in the Durand Cup, that the Late Prime Minister Jawaharlal Nehru felicitated the team at his residence.

In 1990, Salgaocar participated at the Jawaharlal Nehru Centenary Club Cup in Kolkata, which is the only international club tournament held in India. They were knocked out of the tournament after finishing on the bottom of Group-A, where they faced clubs like Paraguayan side Club Olimpia and Danish side Lyngby Boldklub.

Salgaocar participated in the National Football League (India) since the tournament began in 1996, and successfully annexed all possible trophies on the Indian circuit thereby etching their name amongst the top teams in the country. A National League triumph in 1999, 3 Federation Cups in 1988, 1989 and 1997, Super Cup in 1997 and 1999, prestigious Rovers Cup, in 1989, 1996 and 1999, Durand Cup, twice in 1999 and 2003, Sait Nagjee Trophy in Calicut, in 1987 and TFA shield at Madurai, in 1979. Salgaocar Sports Club have also been crowned Goa State Champions for a record 19 times including winners for 3 consecutive years of the Goa Professional League in 2002–03, 2003–04 and 2004–05. The Club also won the Governor's Cup in the years 1999 and 2001. The late 1980s and the 1990s saw Salgaocar SC consistently bag trophies such as the Federation Cup, the National League, the Durand Cup, Rovers Cup and the Super Cup.

The last few years, one may describe as one that has seen the glory years seem light years away. Relegation, a successful promotion, and then again relegation has left the Salgaocar faithfully shattered. Critics have been swift in writing the club off, but managed to make the first division of the NFL in 2003 and staying their till the beginning of the I-League.
In 1996, Salgaocar became one of the original 12 clubs in the National Football League and finished 3rd in Group A but finished 7th in the Final Round. In 1998, at the 9th Asian Cup Winners' Cup, Salgaocar caused an upset victory in its home tie at the Fatorda Stadium against one of the Cup favourites Beijing Guoan from China.

In the 2002–03 National Football League season, Salgaocar achieved success and they earned runners-up position, after ending their journey with 44 points in 22 matches.

Salgaocar along with Viva Kerala ended up as the first two teams to ever be relegated from the I-League, however, the club clinched I-League 2nd Division title in 2008–09 season.

2010–present
In the 2010–11 season, Salgaocar played in the I-League which was India's biggest football competition and they emerged as the champions. After 26 rounds, Salgaocar SC won the title and they qualified for the 2012 Asian Champions League qualifying round.

On 29 September 2011, Salgaocar won their second trophy in four months by winning the 2011 Indian Federation Cup by beating East Bengal in the Final 3–1. This was the first time in Salgaocar history that they had completed a double of league and cup win.

Salgaocar started the 2011–12 I-League as the defending champion. But they had a rather disappointing season where they finished their campaign at 6th position. Salgaocar started the 2012–13 campaign with Karim Bencherifa as their head coach. His one-year contract was terminated before the end of the year, due to poor performances and prolonged national team duties. But he left to take over the reins at Mohun Bagan after two games into the new season. He was replaced by David Booth, who had previously coached Mahindra United and Mumbai. More disappointments followed in the season as they were close to the drop at one time. They finished the season at 7th position. Salgaocar replaced Booth with Derrick Pereira who had been the coach of Pune FC for the past four seasons and had led them to two consecutive top-5 finishes in the I-League. Salgaocar started the 2013–14 I-League brightly and at one time led the table for six game weeks, but a rough patch of 8 games, which included four straight losses, derailed their campaign and saw them lose the title to Bengaluru FC. Salgaocar finished their campaign at third place, which was a marked improvement over their past two campaign finishes.

In 2014 Durand Cup, held from 20 October to 8 November in Goa, Salgaocar emerged championship defeating Pune FC 1–0 in final. The club was later opted out of the 2016–17 I-League season as two other Goan clubs pulled out.

Colours

The colours of Salgaocar are green, and white. The home kit very much shows this as the jersey and socks are green while the shorts are white. The away kit has a set of red jerseys and socks while also having blue/purple shorts.

Ownership
Salgaocar Sports Club, based in Vasco, Goa, was established in 1956 and is owned by the V M Salgaocar Group of Companies. It, however, got the Indian recognition only when Goa was liberated from the Portuguese rule in 1961.

Stadiums

Home grounds

Salgaocar SC plays their home games at Fatorda Stadium and Tilak Maidan Stadium. They used Tilak Maidan for the 2013–14 season. They used Fatorda Stadium and Tilak Maidan Stadium for the 2014–15 season.

Goa Football Association owned Duler Stadium in Mapusa, became the home ground of Salgaocar during the 2012–13 I-League alongside Tilak Maidan Stadium (from the end of January). In Goa, Duler became the second stadium to get AstroTurf since 2006.

Training grounds
Salgaocar players also practiced at the BITS Pilani Campus grounds. The team has its in-house gym with modern equipment and professional trainers.

Rivalries
Salgaocar has rivalries with their fellow Goan sides; Dempo, Churchill Brothers, and Sporting Clube de Goa, whom they faced in I-League and face in Goa Professional League.

Kit manufacturers and shirt sponsors

Season statistics

Performance in AFC competitions

AFC Cup: 1 appearance
2012: Group Stage
 Asian Club Championship: 2 appearances
1989–90: Group Stage
1990–91: Group Stage
 Asian Cup Winners' Cup: 1 appearance
1998–99: 1st Round

Honours

Domestic competitions

League
National Football League
Champions (1): 1998–99
Runners-up (1): 2002–03
Third place (2): 1997–98, 1999–2000
I-League
Champions (1): 2010–11
National Football League II
Champions (1): 2006–07
I-League 2nd division
Champions (1): 2008–09
Goa First Division
Champions (13): 1962–63, 1963–64, 1965–66, 1974–75, 1975–76, 1977–78, 1981–82, 1982–83, 1984–85, 1985–86, 1988–89, 1990–91, 1994–95
Goa Professional League
Champions (6): 1998, 2002, 2003, 2004, 2012–13, 2014–15, 2016–17

Cup
 Federation Cup
Champions (4): 1988, 1989, 1997, 2011
Runners-up (3): 1987, 1990, 1993
 Indian Super Cup
Champions (2): 1998, 1999
Runners-up (1): 2011
 Durand Cup
Champions (3): 1999, 2003, 2014
Rovers Cup
Champions (3): 1989–90, 1996, 1999
Runners-up (1): 1985
Bordoloi Trophy
Runners-up (1): 1985
 Sait Nagjee Football Tournament
Champions (1): 1988
Runners-up (2): 1985, 1989
Goa Governor's Cup
Champions (2): 1999, 2001
Bandodkar Gold Trophy
Champions (3): 1981, 1988, 1992
Runners-up (5): 1970, 1979, 1982, 1984, 1990
Puttiah Memorial Trophy
Champions (1): 1978
Runners-up (1): 1977
 Goa Police Cup
Champions (1): 1978
Runners-up (2): 1970, 2015
 Stafford Challenge Cup
Runners-up (1): 1984

Players

First-team squad

Notable players
For all current and former notable players of Salgaocar FC with a Wikipedia article, see: Salgaocar FC players.

World Cup player
  Hamdi Marzouki (2011–2012)

Affiliated clubs 
The following clubs were affiliated with Salgaocar SC:
  Celtic F.C. (2015–2017)
  FC Goa (2014–2016)

Youth teams and grassroot programs
Salgaocar FC has its various youth sides, which have competed in youth leagues of India. Its U-19 team has previously participated in various editions of Elite League India/I-League U-19, since its inauguration in 2008. In December 2008, Salgaocar U-15 side defeated Raghav Football Club of Gurgaon 2–0 to win the India leg of the fourth (Under-15) Manchester United Premier Cup and earned the right to represent the country in the world finals in Manchester, England.

Salgaocar FC organised three Grassroots Festival through the course of the year to commemorate "AFC Grassroots Day". Children from the club's community outreach program, budding footballers from the club's U-10 and U-12 teams and kids from the club's three partner schools, participated in those festivals.

They launched their grassroots football programme for the youth league of Goa ahead of the 2018–19 season.

See also
List of Salgaocar FC seasons
Football clubs in Goa
List of Goan State Football Champions
Indian football clubs in Asian competitions

References

Bibliography

External links

  of Salgaocar FC
 Team info at Global Sports Archive

 
Association football clubs established in 1956
Football clubs in Goa
I-League clubs
I-League 2nd Division clubs
1956 establishments in Portuguese India
Vasco da Gama, Goa